Magnoliales is an order of flowering plants with six families. The APG system (1998), APG II system (2003), and APG III system (2009) place this order in the clade magnoliids: In these systems,  the Magnoliales are a basal group, excluded from the eudicots.

The anthophytes are a grouping of plant taxa bearing flower-like reproductive structures. They were formerly thought to be a clade comprising plants bearing flower-like structures.  The group contained the angiosperms - the extant flowering plants, such as roses and grasses - as well as the Gnetales and the extinct Bennettitales.

23,420 species of vascular plant have been recorded in South Africa, making it the sixth most species-rich country in the world and the most species-rich country on the African continent. Of these, 153 species are considered to be threatened. Nine biomes have been described in South Africa: Fynbos, Succulent Karoo, desert, Nama Karoo, grassland, savanna, Albany thickets, the Indian Ocean coastal belt, and forests.

The 2018 South African National Biodiversity Institute's National Biodiversity Assessment plant checklist lists 35,130 taxa in the phyla Anthocerotophyta (hornworts (6)), Anthophyta (flowering plants (33534)), Bryophyta (mosses (685)), Cycadophyta (cycads (42)), Lycopodiophyta (Lycophytes(45)), Marchantiophyta (liverworts (376)), Pinophyta (conifers (33)), and Pteridophyta (cryptogams (408)).

One family is represented in the literature. Listed taxa include species, subspecies, varieties, and forms as recorded, some of which have subsequently been allocated to other taxa as synonyms, in which cases the accepted taxon is appended to the listing. Multiple entries under alternative names reflect taxonomic revision over time.

Annonaceae
Family: Annonaceae,

Annona
Genus Annona:
 Annona senegalensis Pers. indigenous
 Annona senegalensis Pers. subsp. senegalensis, indigenous

Artabotrys
Genus Artabotrys:
 Artabotrys aurantiacus Engl. & Diels, accepted as Artabotrys aurantiacus Engl. & Diels var. aurantiacus
 Artabotrys brachypetalus Benth. indigenous
 Artabotrys monteiroae Oliv. indigenous

Hexalobus
Genus Hexalobus:
 Hexalobus monopetalus (A.Rich.) Engl. & Diels, indigenous
 Hexalobus monopetalus (A.Rich.) Engl. & Diels var. monopetalus, indigenous

Monanthotaxis
Genus Monanthotaxis:
 Monanthotaxis caffra (Sond.) Verdc. indigenous

Monodora
Genus Monodora:
 Monodora junodii Engl. & Diels, indigenous
 Monodora junodii Engl. & Diels var. junodii, indigenous
 Monodora junodii Engl. & Diels var. macrantha Paiva, indigenous

Uvaria
Genus Uvaria:
 Uvaria caffra E.Mey. ex Sond. indigenous
 Uvaria gracilipes N.Robson, indigenous
 Uvaria lucida Benth. indigenous
 Uvaria lucida Benth. subsp. virens (N.E.Br.) Verdc. indigenous

Xylopia
Genus Xylopia:
 Xylopia parviflora (A.Rich.) Benth. indigenous

References

South African plant biodiversity lists
Magnoliales